Gergely Kulcsár (10 March 1934 – 12 August 2020) was a Hungarian javelin thrower. He competed at the 1960, 1964, 1968 and 1972 Olympics and won two bronze medals, in 1960 and 1968, and a silver medal in 1964. He was the Olympic flag bearer for Hungary in 1964, 1968, and 1972.

Kulcsár was the first Hungarian to throw over 80 meters and won the national title eight times. Between 1975 and 1980 he was the coach of the Hungarian national throwing team. His trainees included Miklós Németh, a 1976 Olympic champion. From 1981 to 1993 he coached the national throwing team of Kuwait.

References

External links

 
 
 

1934 births
2020 deaths
Hungarian male javelin throwers
Olympic athletes of Hungary
Athletes (track and field) at the 1960 Summer Olympics
Athletes (track and field) at the 1964 Summer Olympics
Athletes (track and field) at the 1968 Summer Olympics
Athletes (track and field) at the 1972 Summer Olympics
Olympic silver medalists for Hungary
Olympic bronze medalists for Hungary
European Athletics Championships medalists
Medalists at the 1968 Summer Olympics
Medalists at the 1964 Summer Olympics
Medalists at the 1960 Summer Olympics
Olympic silver medalists in athletics (track and field)
Olympic bronze medalists in athletics (track and field)
Universiade medalists in athletics (track and field)
Universiade gold medalists for Hungary
Universiade silver medalists for Hungary
Medalists at the 1959 Summer Universiade
Medalists at the 1961 Summer Universiade
Sportspeople from Szabolcs-Szatmár-Bereg County
20th-century Hungarian people
21st-century Hungarian people